Otto Warburg (20 July 1859 – 10 January 1938) was a German-Jewish botanist. He was also a notable industrial agriculture expert, and president of the Zionist Organization from 1911 to 1921.

Biography
Otto Warburg was born in Hamburg on 20 July 1859 to a family whose ancestors came to Germany in 1566, possibly from Bologna. He completed his studies at the Johanneum Gymnasium in Hamburg in 1879, and continued his education in the field of botany at the University of Bonn which he left after one semester to move to the University of Berlin, and later to University of Strasbourg, where he received his Ph.D in 1883. He went on to study chemistry in Munich and physiology in Tübingen with Wilhelm Pfeffer. In 1885 he embarked on a 4-year expedition to Southern and Southeastern Asia, ending in Australia in 1889.

Warburg's cremated remains were brought to Israel and buried at Kibbutz Degania in 1940.

Zionism  and scientific career
In 1911 Warburg was elected president of the Zionist Organization. In 1920 he moved to Palestine and became founding director of the Agricultural Experimental Station in Tel Aviv. It later became the 'Institute of Agriculture and Natural History'. One of his students was Naomi Feinbrun-Dothan.

His findings were later (1913–1922) published in three volumes titled Die Pflanzenwelt. Upon his return to Berlin he co founded Der Tropenpflanzer, a journal specializing in tropical agriculture which he edited for 24 years. Realizing that as a Jew he would not be appointed full professor, he diverted his attentions to applied botanics, and founded several companies of tropical industrial plantations in Germany's colonies.

Warburg was also one of the members of the El Arish expedition, appointed by Theodor Herzl as the agricultural member of the team led by Leopold Kessler.

in 1931 he founded the National Botanic Garden of Israel in the Hebrew University in Jerusalem on Mount Scopus together with the botanist Alexander Eig. After he retired from his position in Jerusalem, Warburg moved back to Berlin, and died in early 1938.

Taxa named include Dovyalis caffra, Virola peruviana, Cephalosphaera usambarensis, and the pitcher plant Nepenthes treubiana.

His son, Gustav Otto Warburg, published in 1939 in London the book “Six years of Hitler – The Jews under the Nazi regime”. The extent to which Jews were being actively persecuted in Germany through the 1930s was a hotly debated issue, with many apologists downplaying the centrality of race in Nazi ideology. This book provided a clear counter argument to this position. Based on official German publications and reliable external reports, it details the many methods adopted by the Nazi party against the Jews.

References

External links 

 University of Berlin biography
 Otto Warburg Center biography
 Otto Warburg Minerva Center for Agricultural Biotechnology
 The personal papers of Otto Warburg are kept at the   Central Zionist Archives in Jerusalem. The notation of the record group is A12.

1859 births
1938 deaths
Botanists with author abbreviations
20th-century German botanists
Jewish biologists
19th-century German botanists
Jewish German scientists
Scientists from Hamburg
Zionist activists
Otto Warburg
University of Strasbourg alumni
German Zionists